Edizioni Marco Valerio was founded in Turin, Italy, on 1 August 2000 as an academic publishing house. It has specialized in humanities titles, with special attention to linguistics, philosophy, and gnosis.

The company has a particular interest in producing texts for visually impaired people, including large print books in Italian, English and French.

External links
 Official website

Publishing companies established in 2000
Book publishing companies of Italy
Companies based in Turin
Mass media in Turin